Clanis baratana is a species of moth of the  family Sphingidae. It is found in Indonesia.

References

Clanis
Moths described in 1998